Ngoni may refer to:

People
 Ngonidzashe Makusha (born 1987), Zimbabwean sprinter and long jumper
 Ngoni Mupamba (born 1990), Zimbabwean cricketer
 Ngoni Makusha (born 1994), Zimbabwean sprinter

Other uses
 Ngoni (instrument), string instrument
 Ngoni language, a Bantu language of Zambia, Tanzania, Mozambique, and Malawi
 Ngoni people, ethnic group in east southern Africa
 Ngoni Moss Frog